The 2004 Portland Timbers season was the 4th season for the Portland Timbers—the 3rd incarnation of a club to bear the Timbers name—of the now-defunct A-League, the second-tier league of the United States and Canada at the time.

Regular season

May

June

July

August

Postseason

Competitions

A-League

Western Conference standings

Results summary

Results by round

A-League Playoffs

Playoff bracket

Western Conference semifinals

U.S. Open Cup

Cup bracket

Third round

Fourth round

Cascadia Cup

Club 
<div style="float:left; width:47%;">

Coaching staff

Top scorers
Players with 1 goal or more included only.

Disciplinary record 
Players with 1 card or more included only.

Goalkeeper stats 
All goalkeepers included.

Player movement

Transfers in

Loans in

Transfers out

Loans out

Unsigned draft picks

Notes
^  The Commissioner's Cup was first created in 1991 to honor the American Professional Soccer League regular season champion and was awarded through the 1996 season. It was revived in 2005 to honor the USL First Division regular season champion and was awarded retroactively to the teams which had amassed the most points in previous A-League seasons from 1997 to 2004. The Commissioner's Cup is currently given to the USL Pro regular season champion.
^  The United Soccer Leagues took over operations of the Edmonton Aviators following financial troubles by the ownership group and the team finished the season as Edmonton Football Club.

References

2004 in Portland, Oregon
2004
American soccer clubs 2004 season
2004 in sports in Oregon